The Orkney Club  is situated in Kirkwall, Orkney.  It was founded in 1826 as a gentlemen's club, ladies first being admitted as members in 1994.  Membership of the club is by nomination and election.

Location 
Before 1892, the Orkney Club members met in a room in the St. Ola Hotel on Kirkwall harbour front. The hotel was owned by Mrs Mary Geddes, whose late husband had been a chemist in the town. The hotel had a bar and billiard room. Bar business was so good that she did not need to run the premises as a hotel and in 1892 decided to have the present Orkney Club building erected (just two doors away from the hotel) for the use of the members and for her own residence.
In 1910, the Orkney Club members bought the premises from Mrs Geddes and meets there to this day.

References

External links
Official website

Organisations based in Orkney
Kirkwall
Organizations established in 1826
1826 establishments in Scotland